The Central Cal War Angels were a team of the Women's Football Alliance which began play for the 2010 season.  Based in Fresno, California, the War Angels play their home games on the campus of Fresno City College.

Season-By-Season

2010

Standings

Season schedule

** = Won by forfeit

2011

Standings

Season schedule

** = Won by forfeit

2012

Standings

Season schedule

2013

Standings

Season schedule

** = Won by forfeit

2014

Standings

Season schedule

** = Won by forfeit

2015

Standings

Season schedule

** = Won by forfeit

2016

Standings

Season schedule

** = Won by forfeit

References

Central Cal War Angels Facebook
Central Cal War Angels website
Women's Football Alliance website

Women's Football Alliance teams
Sports in Fresno, California
American football teams in California
American football teams established in 2010
2010 establishments in California
Women's sports in California